Gephyrochromis moorii is a species of haplochromine cichlid. It is endemic to Lake Malawi where is found exclusively over open sand areas, where it lives in small groups numbering between three and seven individuals The males are not strictly territorial but defend feeding sites from other males.  The specific name honours the English cytologist and biologist John Edmund Sharrock Moore (1870-1947).

References

Fish of Malawi
Gephyrochromis
Taxa named by George Albert Boulenger
Fish described in 1901
Taxonomy articles created by Polbot
Fish of Lake Malawi